The MacArthur Fellows Program, also known as the MacArthur Fellowship and commonly but unofficially known as the "Genius Grant", is a prize awarded annually by the John D. and Catherine T. MacArthur Foundation typically to between 20 and 30 individuals, working in any field, who have shown "extraordinary originality and dedication in their creative pursuits and a marked capacity for self-direction" and are citizens or residents of the United States.

According to the foundation's website, "the fellowship is not a reward for past accomplishment, but rather an investment in a person's originality, insight, and potential," but it also says such potential is "based on a track record of significant accomplishments." The current prize is $800,000 paid over five years in quarterly installments. Previously it was $625,000. This figure was increased from $500,000 in 2013 with the release of a review of the MacArthur Fellows Program. Since 1981, 1,111 people have been named MacArthur Fellows, ranging in age from 18 to 82. The award has been called "one of the most significant awards that is truly 'no strings attached'".

The program does not accept applications. Anonymous and confidential nominations are invited by the foundation and reviewed by an anonymous and confidential selection committee of about a dozen people. The committee reviews all nominees and recommends recipients to the president and board of directors. Most new fellows first learn of their nomination and award upon receiving a congratulatory phone call. MacArthur Fellow Jim Collins described this experience in an editorial column of The New York Times.

Cecilia Conrad is the managing director leading the MacArthur Fellows Program.

Recipients

Since the inaugural class of 1981, the program has awarded 1,111 fellowships.  Alumni of Harvard University account for 175 fellowships, followed by the alumni of Yale University (93), University of California, Berkeley (75), Princeton University (68), and Columbia University (54). The following ten universities have the most alumni fellows.

1981 

A. R. Ammons, poet
Joseph Brodsky, poet
John Cairns, molecular biologist
Gregory V. Chudnovsky, mathematician
Joel E. Cohen, population biologist
Robert Coles, child psychiatrist
Richard Critchfield, essayist
Shelly Errington, cultural anthropologist
Howard Gardner, psychologist
Henry Louis Gates Jr., literary critic
John Gaventa, sociologist
Michael Ghiselin, evolutionary biologist
Stephen Jay Gould, paleontologist
Ian Graham, archaeologist
David Hawkins, philosopher
John P. Holdren, arms control and energy analyst
Ada Louise Huxtable, architectural critic and historian
John Imbrie, climatologist
Robert Kates, geographer
Raphael Carl Lee, surgeon
Elma Lewis, arts educator
Cormac McCarthy, writer
Barbara McClintock, geneticist
James Alan McPherson, short story writer and essayist
Roy P. Mottahedeh, historian
Richard C. Mulligan, molecular biologist
Douglas D. Osheroff, physicist
Elaine H. Pagels, historian of religion
David Pingree, historian of science
Paul G. Richards, seismologist
Robert Root-Bernstein, biologist and historian of science
Richard Rorty, philosopher
Lawrence Rosen, attorney and anthropologist
Carl Emil Schorske, intellectual historian
Leslie Marmon Silko, writer
Joseph Hooton Taylor Jr., astrophysicist
Derek Walcott, poet and playwright
Robert Penn Warren, poet, novelist, and literary critic
Stephen Wolfram, computer scientist and physicist
Michael Woodford, economist
George Zweig, physicist and neurobiologist

1982 

Fouad Ajami, political scientist
Charles A. Bigelow, type designer
Peter Robert Lamont Brown, historian
Robert Darnton, European historian
Persi Diaconis, statistician
William Gaddis, novelist
Ved Mehta, writer
Bob Moses, educator and philosopher
Richard A. Muller, geologist and astrophysicist
Conlon Nancarrow, composer
Alfonso Ortiz, cultural anthropologist
Francesca Rochberg, Assyriologist and historian of science
Charles Sabel, political scientist and legal scholar
Ralph Shapey, composer and conductor
Michael Silverstein, linguist
Randolph Whitfield Jr., ophthalmologist
Frank Wilczek, physicist
Frederick Wiseman, documentary filmmaker
Edward Witten, physicist, creator of the M-Theory

1983 

R. Stephen Berry, physical chemist
Seweryn Bialer, political scientist
William C. Clark, ecologist and environmental policy analyst
Philip D. Curtin, historian of Africa
William H. Durham, biological anthropologist
Bradley Efron, statistician
David L. Felten, neuroscientist
Randall W. Forsberg, political scientist and arms control strategist
Alexander L. George, political scientist
Shelomo Dov Goitein, medieval historian
Mott T. Greene, historian of science
James E. Gunn, astronomer
Ramón A. Gutiérrez, historian
John J. Hopfield, physicist and biologist
Béla Julesz, psychologist
William Kennedy, novelist
Leszek Kołakowski, historian of philosophy and religion
Sylvia A. Law, human rights lawyer
Brad Leithauser, poet and writer
Lawrence W. Levine, historian
Ralph Manheim, translator
Robert K. Merton, historian and sociologist of science
Walter F. Morris Jr., cultural preservationist
Charles S. Peskin, mathematician and physiologist
A.K. Ramanujan, poet, translator, and literary scholar
Alice M. Rivlin, economist and policy analyst
Julia Robinson, mathematician
John Sayles, filmmaker and writer
Richard M. Schoen, mathematician
Peter Sellars, theater and opera director
Karen K. Uhlenbeck, mathematician
Adrian Wilson, book designer, printer, and book historian
Irene J. Winter, art historian and archaeologist
Mark S. Wrighton, chemist

1984 

George W. Archibald, ornithologist
Shelly Bernstein, pediatric hematologist
Peter J. Bickel, statistician
Ernesto J. Cortes Jr., community organizer
William Drayton, public service innovator
Sidney Drell, physicist and arms policy analyst
Mitchell J. Feigenbaum, mathematical physicist
Michael H. Freedman, mathematician
Curtis G. Hames, family physician
Robert Hass, poet, critic, and translator
Shirley Heath, linguistic anthropologist
J. Bryan Hehir, religion and foreign policy scholar
Bette Howland, writer and literary critic
Bill Irwin, clown, writer, and performance artist
Robert Irwin, light and space artist
Ruth Prawer Jhabvala, novelist and screenwriter
Fritz John, mathematician
Galway Kinnell, poet
Henry Kraus, labor and art historian
Paul Oskar Kristeller, intellectual historian and philosopher
Sara Lawrence-Lightfoot, educator
Heather Lechtman, materials scientist and archaeologist
Michael Lerner, public health leader
Andrew W. Lewis, medieval historian
Arnold J. Mandell, neuroscientist and psychiatrist
Peter Mathews, archaeologist and epigrapher
Matthew Meselson, geneticist and arms control analyst
David R. Nelson, physicist
Beaumont Newhall, historian of photography
Roger S. Payne, zoologist and conservationist
Michael Piore, economist
Edward V. Roberts, disability rights leader
Judith N. Shklar, political philosopher
Charles Simic, poet, translator, and essayist
Elliot Sperling, Tibetan studies scholar
David Stuart, linguist and epigrapher
Frank Sulloway, psychologist (child birth-order research)
John E. Toews, intellectual historian
Alar Toomre, astronomer and mathematician
James Turrell, light sculptor
Amos Tversky, cognitive scientist
Bret Wallach, geographer
Jay Weiss, psychologist
Arthur Winfree, physiologist and mathematician
J. Kirk Varnedoe, art historian
Carl R. Woese, molecular biologist
Billie Young, community development leader

1985 

Joan Abrahamson, community development leader
John Ashbery, poet
John F. Benton, medieval historian
Harold Bloom, literary critic
Valery Chalidze, physicist and human rights organizer
William Cronon, environmental historian
Merce Cunningham, choreographer
Jared Diamond, environmental historian and geographer
Marian Wright Edelman, Children's Defense Fund founder
Morton Halperin, political scientist
Robert M. Hayes, lawyer and human rights leader
Edwin Hutchins, cognitive scientist
Sam Maloof, professional woodworker and furniture maker
Andrew McGuire, trauma prevention specialist
Patrick Noonan, conservationist
George Oster, mathematical biologist
Thomas G. Palaima, classicist
Peter Raven, botanist
Jane S. Richardson, biochemist
Gregory Schopen, historian of religion
Franklin Stahl, geneticist
J. Richard Steffy, nautical archaeologist
Ellen Stewart, theater director
Paul Taylor, choreographer, dance company founder
Shing-Tung Yau, mathematician

1986 

Paul Adams, neurobiologist
Milton Babbitt, composer and music theorist
Christopher Beckwith, philologist
Richard Benson, photographer
Lester R. Brown, agricultural economist
Caroline Bynum, medieval historian
William A. Christian, historian of religion
Nancy Farriss, historian
Benedict Gross, mathematician
Daryl Hine, poet and translator
John Robert Horner, paleobiologist
Thomas C. Joe, social policy analyst
David Keightley, historian and sinologist
Albert J. Libchaber, physicist
David C. Page, molecular geneticist
George Perle, composer and music theorist
James Randi, magician
David Rudovsky, civil rights lawyer
Robert Shapley, neurophysiologist
Leo Steinberg, art historian
Richard P. Turco, atmospheric scientist
Thomas Whiteside, journalist
Allan C. Wilson, biochemist
Jay Wright, poet and playwright
Charles Wuorinen, composer

1987 

Walter Abish, writer
Robert Axelrod, political scientist
Robert F. Coleman, mathematician
Douglas Crase, poet
Daniel Friedan, physicist
David Gross, physicist
Ira Herskowitz, molecular geneticist
Irving Howe, literary and social critic
Wesley Charles Jacobs Jr., rural planner
Peter Jeffery, musicologist
Horace Freeland Judson, historian of science
Stuart Alan Kauffman, evolutionary biologist
Richard Kenney, poet
Eric Lander, geneticist and mathematician
Michael Malin, geologist and planetary scientist
Deborah W. Meier, education reform leader
Arnaldo Dante Momigliano, historian
David Mumford, mathematician
Tina Rosenberg, journalist
David Rumelhart, cognitive scientist and psychologist
Robert Morris Sapolsky, neuroendocrinologist and primatologist
Meyer Schapiro, art historian
John H. Schwarz, physicist
Jon Seger, evolutionary ecologist
Stephen Shenker, physicist
David Dean Shulman, historian of religion
Muriel S. Snowden, community organizer
Mark Strand, poet and writer
May Swenson, poet
Huỳnh Sanh Thông, translator and editor
William Julius Wilson, sociologist
Richard Wrangham, primate ethologist

1988 

Charles Archambeau, geophysicist
Michael Baxandall, art historian
Ruth Behar, cultural anthropologist
Ran Blake, composer and pianist
Charles Burnett, filmmaker
Philip James DeVries, insect biologist
Andre Dubus, writer
Helen T. Edwards, physicist
Jon H. Else, documentary filmmaker
John G. Fleagle, primatologist and paleontologist
Cornell H. Fleischer, Middle Eastern historian
Getatchew Haile, philologist and linguist
Raymond Jeanloz, geophysicist
Marvin Philip Kahl, zoologist
Naomi Pierce, biologist
Thomas Pynchon, novelist
Stephen J. Pyne, environmental historian
Max Roach, drummer and jazz composer
Hipolito (Paul) Roldan, community developer
Anna Curtenius Roosevelt, archaeologist
David Alan Rosenberg, military historian
Susan Irene Rotroff, archaeologist
Bruce Schwartz, figurative sculptor and puppeteer
Robert Shaw, physicist
Jonathan Spence, historian
Noel M. Swerdlow, historian of science
Gary A. Tomlinson, musicologist
Alan Walker, paleontologist
Eddie N. Williams, policy analyst and civil rights leader
Rita P. Wright, archaeologist
Garth Youngberg, agriculturalist

1989 

Anthony Amsterdam, attorney and legal scholar
Byllye Avery, women's healthcare leader
Alvin Bronstein, human rights lawyer
Leo Buss, evolutionary biologist
Jay Cantor, writer
George Davis, environmental policy analyst
Allen Grossman, poet
John Harbison, composer and conductor
Keith Hefner, journalist and educator
Ralf Hotchkiss, rehabilitation engineer
John Rice Irwin, curator and cultural preservationist
Daniel Janzen, ecologist
Bernice Johnson Reagon, music historian, composer, and vocalist
Aaron Lansky, cultural preservationist
Jennifer Moody, archaeologist and anthropologist
Errol Morris, filmmaker
Vivian Paley, educator and writer
Richard Powers, novelist
Martin Puryear, sculptor
Theodore Rosengarten, historian
Margaret W. Rossiter, historian of science
George Russell, composer and music theorist
Pam Solo, arms control analyst
Ellendea Proffer Teasley, translator and publisher
Claire Van Vliet, book artist
Baldemar Velasquez, farm labor leader
Bill Viola, video artist
Eliot Wigginton, educator
Patricia Wright, primatologist

1990 

John Christian Bailar, biostatistician
Martha Clarke, theater director
Jacques d'Amboise, dance educator
Guy Davenport, writer, critic, and translator
Lisa Delpit, education reform leader
John Eaton, composer
Paul R. Ehrlich, population biologist
Charlotte Erickson, historian
Lee Friedlander, photographer
Margaret Geller, astrophysicist
Jorie Graham, poet
Patricia Hampl, writer
John Hollander, poet and literary critic
Thomas Cleveland Holt, social and cultural historian
David Kazhdan, mathematician
Calvin King, land and farm development specialist
M. A. R. Koehl, marine biologist
Nancy Kopell, mathematician
Michael Moschen, performance artist
Gary Nabhan, ethnobotanist
Sherry Ortner, anthropologist
Otis Pitts, community development leader
Yvonne Rainer, filmmaker and choreographer
Michael Schudson, sociologist
Rebecca J. Scott, historian
Marc Shell, scholar
Susan Sontag, writer and cultural critic
Richard Stallman, Free Software Foundation founder, copyleft concept inventor
Guy Tudor, conservationist
Maria Varela, community development leader
Gregory Vlastos, classicist and philosopher
Kent Whealy, preservationist
Eric Wolf, anthropologist
Sidney Wolfe, physician
Robert Woodson, community development leader
José Zalaquett, human rights lawyer

1991 

Jacqueline Barton, biophysical chemist
Paul Berman, journalist
James Blinn, computer animator
Taylor Branch, social historian
Trisha Brown, choreographer
Mari Jo Buhle, American historian
Patricia Churchland, (neuro)philosopher
David Donoho, statistician
Steven Feld, anthropologist
Alice Fulton, poet
Guillermo Gómez-Peña, writer and artist
Jerzy Grotowski, theater director
David Hammons, artist
Sophia Bracy Harris, child care leader
Lewis Hyde, writer
Ali Akbar Khan, musician
Sergiu Klainerman, mathematician
Martin Kreitman, geneticist
Harlan Lane, psychologist and linguist
William Linder, community development leader
Patricia Locke, tribal rights leader
Mark Morris, choreographer and dancer
Marcel Ophüls, documentary filmmaker
Arnold Rampersad, biographer and literary critic
Gunther Schuller, composer, conductor, jazz historian
Joel Schwartz, epidemiologist
Cecil Taylor, jazz pianist and composer
Julie Taymor, theater director
David Werner, health care leader
James Westphal, engineer and scientist
Eleanor Wilner, poet

1992 

Janet Benshoof, human rights lawyer
Robert Blackburn, printmaker
Unita Blackwell, civil rights leader
Lorna Bourg, rural development leader
Stanley Cavell, philosopher
Amy Clampitt, poet
Ingrid Daubechies, mathematician
Wendy Ewald, photographer
Irving Feldman, poet
Barbara Fields, historian
Robert Hall, journalist
Ann Ellis Hanson, historian
John Henry Holland, computer scientist
Wes Jackson, agronomist
Evelyn Keller, historian and philosopher of science
Steve Lacy, saxophonist and composer
Suzanne Lebsock, social historian
Sharon Long, plant biologist
Norman Manea, writer
Paule Marshall, writer
Michael Massing, journalist
Robert McCabe, educator
Susan Meiselas, photojournalist
Amalia Mesa-Bains, artist and cultural critic
Stephen Schneider, climatologist
Joanna Scott, writer
John T. Scott, artist
John Terborgh, conservation biologist
Twyla Tharp, dancer and choreographer
Philip Treisman, mathematics educator
Laurel Thatcher Ulrich, historian
Geerat J. Vermeij, evolutionary biologist
Günter Wagner, developmental biologist

1993 

Nancy Cartwright, philosopher
Demetrios Christodoulou, mathematician and physicist
Maria Crawford, geologist
Stanley Crouch, jazz critic and writer
Nora England, anthropological linguist
Paul Farmer, medical anthropologist
Victoria Foe, developmental biologist
Ernest Gaines, writer
Pedro Greer, physician
Thom Gunn, poet and literary critic
Ann Hamilton, artist
Sokoni Karanja, child and family development specialist
Ann Lauterbach, poet and literary critic
Stephen Lee, chemist
Carol Levine, AIDS policy specialist
Amory Lovins, physicist and energy analyst
Jane Lubchenco, marine biologist
Ruth Lubic, nurse and midwife
Jim Powell, poet, translator, and literary critic
Margie Profet, evolutionary biologist
Thomas Scanlon, philosopher
Aaron Shirley, health care leader
William Siemering, journalist and radio producer
Ellen Silbergeld, toxicologist
Leonard van der Kuijp, philologist and historian
Frank von Hippel, arms control and energy analyst
John Edgar Wideman, writer
Heather Williams, biologist and ornithologist
Marion Williams, gospel music performer
Robert H. Williams, physicist and energy analyst
Henry T. Wright, archaeologist and anthropologist

1994 

Robert Adams, photographer
Jeraldyne Blunden, choreographer
Anthony Braxton, avant-garde composer and musician
Rogers Brubaker, sociologist
Ornette Coleman, jazz performer and composer
Israel Gelfand, mathematician 
Faye Ginsburg, anthropologist
Heidi Hartmann, economist
Bill T. Jones, dancer and choreographer
Peter E. Kenmore, agricultural entomologist
Joseph E. Marshall, educator
Carolyn McKecuen, economic development leader
Donella Meadows, writer
Arthur Mitchell, company director and choreographer
Hugo Morales, radio producer
Janine Pease, educator
Willie Reale, theater arts educator
Adrienne Rich, poet and writer
Sam-Ang Sam, musician and cultural preservationist
Jack Wisdom, physicist

1995 

Allison Anders, filmmaker
Jed Z. Buchwald, historian
Octavia E. Butler, science fiction novelist
Sandra Cisneros, writer and poet
Sandy Close, journalist
Frederick C. Cuny, disaster relief specialist
Sharon Emerson, biologist
Richard Foreman, theater director
Alma Guillermoprieto, journalist
Virginia Hamilton, writer
Donald Hopkins, physician
Susan W. Kieffer, geologist
Elizabeth LeCompte, theater director
Patricia Nelson Limerick, historian
Michael Marletta, chemist
Pamela Matson, ecologist
Susan McClary, musicologist
Meredith Monk, vocalist, composer, director
Rosalind P. Petchesky, political scientist
Joel Rogers, political scientist
Cindy Sherman, photographer
Bryan Stevenson, human rights lawyer
Nicholas Strausfeld, neurobiologist
Richard White, historian

1996 

James Roger Prior Angel, astronomer
Joaquin Avila, voting rights advocate
Allan Bérubé, historian
Barbara Block, marine biologist
Joan Breton Connelly, classical archaeologist
Thomas Daniel, biologist
Martin Daniel Eakes, economic development strategist
Rebecca Goldstein, writer
Robert Greenstein, public policy analyst
Richard Howard, poet, translator, and literary critic
John Jesurun, playwright
Richard Lenski, biologist
Louis Massiah, documentary filmmaker
Vonnie McLoyd, developmental psychologist
Thylias Moss, poet and writer
Eiko Otake and Koma Otake, dancers, choreographers
Nathan Seiberg, physicist
Anna Deavere Smith, playwright, journalist, actress
Dorothy Stoneman, educator
Bill Strickland, art educator

1997 

Luis Alfaro, writer and performance artist
Lee Breuer, playwright
Vija Celmins, artist
Eric Charnov, evolutionary biologist
Elouise P. Cobell, banker
Peter Galison, historian
Mark Harrington, AIDS researcher
Eva Harris, molecular biologist
Michael Kremer, economist
Russell Lande, biologist
Kerry James Marshall, artist
Nancy A. Moran, evolutionary biologist and ecologist
Han Ong, playwright
Kathleen Ross, educator
Pamela Samuelson, copyright scholar and activist
Susan Stewart, literary scholar and poet
Elizabeth Streb, dancer and choreographer
Trimpin, sound sculptor
Loïc Wacquant, sociologist
Kara Walker, artist
David Foster Wallace, author and journalist
Andrew Wiles, mathematician
Brackette Williams, anthropologist

1998 

Janine Antoni, artist
Ida Applebroog, artist
Ellen Barry, attorney and human rights activist
Tim Berners-Lee, inventor of the World Wide Web
Linda Bierds, poet
Bernadette Brooten, historian
John Carlstrom, astrophysicist
Mike Davis, historian
Nancy Folbre, economist
Avner Greif, economist
Kun-Liang Guan, biochemist
Gary Hill, artist
Edward Hirsch, poet, essayist
Ayesha Jalal, historian
Charles R. Johnson, writer
Leah Krubitzer, neuroscientist
Stewart Kwoh, human rights activist
Charles Lewis, journalist
William W. McDonald, rancher and conservationist
Peter N. Miller, historian
Don Mitchell, cultural geographer
Rebecca Nelson, plant pathologist
Elinor Ochs, linguistic anthropologist
Ishmael Reed, poet, essayist, novelist
Benjamin D. Santer, atmospheric scientist
Karl Sims, computer scientist and artist
Dorothy Thomas, human rights activist
Leonard Zeskind, human rights activist
Mary Zimmerman, playwright

1999 

Jillian Banfield, geologist
Carolyn Bertozzi, chemist
Xu Bing, artist and printmaker
Bruce G. Blair, policy analyst
John Bonifaz, election lawyer and voting rights leader
Shawn Carlson, science educator
Mark Danner, journalist
Alison L. Des Forges, human rights activist
Elizabeth Diller, architect
Saul Friedländer, historian
Jennifer Gordon, lawyer
David Hillis, biologist
Sara Horowitz, lawyer
Jacqueline Jones, historian
Laura L. Kiessling, biochemist
Leslie Kurke, classicist
David Levering Lewis, biographer and historian
Juan Maldacena, physicist
Gay J. McDougall, human rights lawyer
Campbell McGrath, poet
Denny Moore, anthropological linguist
Elizabeth Murray, artist
Pepón Osorio, artist
Ricardo Scofidio, architect
Peter Shor, computer scientist
Eva Silverstein, physicist
Wilma Subra, scientist
Ken Vandermark, saxophonist, composer
Naomi Wallace, playwright
Jeffrey Weeks, mathematician
Fred Wilson, artist
Ofelia Zepeda, linguist

2000 

Susan E. Alcock, archaeologist
K. Christopher Beard, paleontologist
Lucy Blake, conservationist
Anne Carson, poet
Peter J. Hayes, energy policy activist
David Isay, radio producer
Alfredo Jaar, photographer
Ben Katchor, graphic novelist
Hideo Mabuchi, physicist
Susan Marshall, choreographer
Samuel Mockbee, architect
Cecilia Muñoz, civil rights policy analyst
Margaret Murnane, optical physicist
Laura Otis, literary scholar and historian of science
Lucia M. Perillo, poet
Matthew Rabin, economist
Carl Safina, marine conservationist
Daniel P. Schrag, geochemist
Susan E. Sygall, civil rights leader
Gina G. Turrigiano, neuroscientist
Gary Urton, anthropologist
Patricia J. Williams, legal scholar
Deborah Willis, historian of photography and photographer
Erik Winfree, computer and materials scientist
Horng-Tzer Yau, mathematician

2001 

Andrea Barrett, writer
Christopher Chyba, astrobiologist
Michael Dickinson, fly biologist, bioengineer
Rosanne Haggerty, housing and community development leader
Lene Hau, physicist
Dave Hickey, art critic
Stephen Hough, pianist and composer
Kay Redfield Jamison, psychologist
Sandra Lanham, pilot and conservationist
Iñigo Manglano-Ovalle, artist
Cynthia Moss, natural historian
Aihwa Ong, anthropologist
Dirk Obbink, classicist and papyrologist
Norman R. Pace, biochemist
Suzan-Lori Parks, playwright
Brooks Pate, physical chemist
Xiao Qiang, human rights leader
Geraldine Seydoux, molecular biologist
Bright Sheng, composer
David Spergel, astrophysicist
Jean Strouse, biographer
Julie Su, human rights lawyer
David Wilson, museum founder

2002 

Danielle Allen, classicist and political scientist
Bonnie Bassler, molecular biologist
Ann M. Blair, intellectual historian
Katherine Boo, journalist
Paul Ginsparg, physicist
David B. Goldstein, energy conservation specialist
Karen Hesse, writer
Janine Jagger, epidemiologist
Daniel Jurafsky, computer scientist and linguist
Toba Khedoori, artist
Liz Lerman, choreographer
George E. Lewis, trombonist
Liza Lou, artist
Edgar Meyer, bassist and composer
Jack Miles, writer and Biblical scholar
Erik Mueggler, anthropologist and ethnographer
Sendhil Mullainathan, economist
Stanley Nelson, documentary filmmaker
Lee Ann Newsom, paleoethnobotanist
Daniela L. Rus, computer scientist
Charles C. Steidel, astronomer
Brian Tucker, seismologist
Camilo José Vergara, photographer
Paul Wennberg, atmospheric chemist
Colson Whitehead, writer

2003 

Guillermo Algaze, archaeologist
Jim Collins, biomedical engineer
Lydia Davis, writer and translator
Erik Demaine, theoretical computer scientist
Corinne Dufka, human rights researcher
Peter Gleick, conservation analyst
Osvaldo Golijov, composer
Deborah Jin, physicist
Angela Johnson, writer
Tom Joyce, blacksmith
Sarah H. Kagan, gerontological nurse
Ned Kahn, artist and science exhibit designer
Jim Yong Kim, public health physician
Nawal M. Nour, obstetrician and gynecologist
Loren H. Rieseberg, botanist
Amy Rosenzweig, biochemist
Pedro A. Sanchez, agronomist
Lateefah Simon, women's development leader
Peter Sís, illustrator
Sarah Sze, sculptor
Eve Troutt Powell, historian
Anders Winroth, historian
Daisy Youngblood, ceramic artist
Xiaowei Zhuang, biophysicist

2004 

Angela Belcher, materials scientist and engineer
Gretchen Berland, physician and filmmaker
James Carpenter, artist
Joseph DeRisi, biologist
Katherine Gottlieb, health care leader
David Green, technology transfer innovator
Aleksandar Hemon, writer
Heather Hurst, archaeological illustrator
Edward P. Jones, writer
John Kamm, human rights activist
Daphne Koller, computer scientist
Naomi Leonard, engineer
Tommie Lindsey, school debate coach
Rueben Martinez, businessman and activist
Maria Mavroudi, historian
Vamsi Mootha, physician and computational biologist
Judy Pfaff, sculptor
Aminah Robinson, artist
Reginald Robinson, pianist and composer
Cheryl Rogowski, farmer
Amy Smith, inventor and mechanical engineer
Julie Theriot, microbiologist
C. D. Wright, poet

2005 

Marin Alsop, symphony conductor
Ted Ames, fisherman, conservationist, marine biologist
Terry Belanger, rare book preservationist
Edet Belzberg, documentary filmmaker
Majora Carter, urban revitalization strategist
Lu Chen, neuroscientist
Michael Cohen, pharmacist
Joseph Curtin, violinmaker
Aaron Dworkin, music educator
Teresita Fernández, sculptor
Claire Gmachl, quantum cascade laser engineer
Sue Goldie, physician and researcher
Steven Goodman, conservation biologist
Pehr Harbury, biochemist
Nicole King, molecular biologist
Jon Kleinberg, computer scientist
Jonathan Lethem, novelist
Michael Manga, geophysicist
Todd Martinez, theoretical chemist
Julie Mehretu, painter
Kevin M. Murphy, economist
Olufunmilayo Olopade, clinician and researcher
Fazal Sheikh, photographer
Emily Thompson, aural historian
Michael Walsh, vehicle emissions specialist

2006 

David Carroll, naturalist author and illustrator
Regina Carter, jazz violinist
Kenneth C. Catania, neurobiologist
Lisa Curran, tropical forester
Kevin Eggan, biologist
Jim Fruchterman, technologist, CEO of Benetech
Atul Gawande, surgeon and author
Linda Griffith, bioengineer
Victoria Hale, CEO of OneWorld Health
Adrian Nicole LeBlanc, journalist and author
David Macaulay, author and illustrator
Josiah McElheny, sculptor
D. Holmes Morton, physician
John A. Rich, physician
Jennifer Richeson, social psychologist
Sarah Ruhl, playwright
George Saunders, short story writer
Anna Schuleit, commemorative artist
Shahzia Sikander, painter
Terence Tao, mathematician
Claire J. Tomlin, aviation engineer
Luis von Ahn, computer scientist
Edith Widder, deep-sea explorer
Matias Zaldarriaga, cosmologist
John Zorn, composer and musician

2007 

Deborah Bial, education strategist
Peter Cole, translator, poet, publisher
Lisa Cooper, public health physician
Ruth DeFries, environmental geographer
Mercedes Doretti, forensic anthropologist
Stuart Dybek, short story writer
Marc Edwards, water quality engineer
Michael Elowitz, molecular biologist
Saul Griffith, inventor
Sven Haakanson, Alutiiq curator, anthropologist, preservationist
Corey Harris, blues musician
Cheryl Hayashi, spider silk biologist
My Hang V. Huynh, chemist
Claire Kremen, conservation biologist
Whitfield Lovell, painter and installation artist
Yoky Matsuoka, neuroroboticist
Lynn Nottage, playwright
Mark Roth, biomedical scientist
Paul Rothemund, nanotechnologist
Jay Rubenstein, medieval historian
Jonathan Shay, clinical psychiatrist and classicist
Joan Snyder, painter
Dawn Upshaw, vocalist
Shen Wei, choreographer

2008 

Chimamanda Ngozi Adichie, novelist
Will Allen, urban farmer
Regina Benjamin, rural family doctor
Kirsten Bomblies, evolutionary plant geneticist
Tara Donovan, artist
Andrea Ghez, astrophysicist
Stephen D. Houston, anthropologist
Mary Jackson, weaver and sculptor
Leila Josefowicz, violinist
Alexei Kitaev, physicist
Walter Kitundu, instrument maker and composer
Susan Mango, developmental biologist
Diane E. Meier, geriatrician
David R. Montgomery, geomorphologist
John Ochsendorf, engineer and architectural historian
Peter Pronovost, critical care physician
Adam Riess, astrophysicist
Alex Ross, music critic
Wafaa El-Sadr, infectious disease specialist
Nancy Siraisi, historian of medicine
Marin Soljačić, optical physicist
Sally Temple, neuroscientist
Jennifer Tipton, stage lighting designer
Rachel Wilson, experimental neurobiologist
Miguel Zenón, saxophonist and composer

2009 

Lynsey Addario, photojournalist
Maneesh Agrawala, computer vision technologist
Timothy Barrett, papermaker
Mark Bradford, mixed media artist
Edwidge Danticat, novelist
Rackstraw Downes, painter
Esther Duflo, economist
Deborah Eisenberg, short story writer
Lin He, molecular biologist
Peter Huybers, climate scientist
James Longley, filmmaker
L. Mahadevan, applied mathematician
Heather McHugh, poet
Jerry Mitchell, investigative reporter
Rebecca Onie, health services innovator
Richard Prum, ornithologist
John A. Rogers, applied physicist
Elyn Saks, mental health lawyer
Jill Seaman, infectious disease physician
Beth Shapiro, evolutionary biologist
Daniel Sigman, biogeochemist
Mary Tinetti, geriatric physician
Camille Utterback, digital artist
Theodore Zoli, bridge engineer

2010 

Amir Abo-Shaeer, physics teacher
Jessie Little Doe Baird, Wampanoag language preservation and revival
Kelly Benoit-Bird, marine biologist
Nicholas Benson, stone carver
Drew Berry, biomedical animator
Carlos D. Bustamante, population geneticist
Matthew Carter, type designer
David Cromer, theater director and actor
John Dabiri, biophysicist
Shannon Lee Dawdy, anthropologist
Annette Gordon-Reed, American historian
Yiyun Li, fiction writer
Michal Lipson, optical physicist
Nergis Mavalvala, quantum astrophysicist
Jason Moran, jazz pianist and composer
Carol Padden, sign language linguist
Jorge Pardo, installation artist
Sebastian Ruth, violist, violinist, and music educator
Emmanuel Saez, economist
David Simon, author, screenwriter, and producer
Dawn Song, computer security specialist
Marla Spivak, entomologist
Elizabeth Turk, sculptor

2011 

Jad Abumrad, radio host and producer
Marie-Therese Connolly, elder rights lawyer
Roland Fryer, economist
Jeanne Gang, architect
Elodie Ghedin, parasitologist and virologist
Markus Greiner, condensed matter physicist
Kevin Guskiewicz, sports medicine researcher
Peter Hessler, long-form journalist
Tiya Miles, public historian
Matthew Nock, clinical psychologist
Francisco Núñez, choral conductor and composer
Sarah Otto, evolutionary geneticist
Shwetak Patel, sensor technologist and computer scientist
Dafnis Prieto, jazz percussionist and composer
Kay Ryan, poet
Melanie Sanford, organometallic chemist
William Seeley, neuropathologist
Jacob Soll, European historian
A. E. Stallings, poet and translator
Ubaldo Vitali, conservator and silversmith
Alisa Weilerstein, cellist
Yukiko Yamashita, developmental biologist

2012 

Natalia Almada, documentary filmmaker
Uta Barth, photographer
Claire Chase, arts entrepreneur and flautist
Raj Chetty, economist
Maria Chudnovsky, mathematician
Eric Coleman, geriatrician
Junot Díaz, fiction writer
David Finkel, journalist
Olivier Guyon, optical physicist and astronomer
Elissa Hallem, neurobiologist
An-My Lê, photographer
Sarkis Mazmanian, medical microbiologist
Dinaw Mengestu, writer
Maurice Lim Miller, social services innovator
Dylan C. Penningroth, historian
Terry Plank, geochemist
Laura Poitras, documentary filmmaker
Nancy Rabalais, marine ecologist
Benoît Rolland, stringed-instrument bow maker
Daniel Spielman, computer scientist
Melody Swartz, bioengineer
Chris Thile, mandolinist and composer
Benjamin Warf, neurosurgeon

2013 

Kyle Abraham, choreographer and dancer
Donald Antrim, writer
Phil Baran, organic chemist
C. Kevin Boyce, paleobotanist
Jeffrey Brenner, primary care physician 
Colin Camerer, behavioral economist
Jeremy Denk, pianist and writer
Angela Duckworth, research psychologist
Craig Fennie, materials scientist
Robin Fleming, medieval historian
Carl Haber, audio preservationist
Vijay Iyer, jazz pianist and composer
Dina Katabi, computer scientist
Julie Livingston, public health historian and anthropologist
David Lobell, agricultural ecologist
Tarell Alvin McCraney, playwright 
Susan Murphy, statistician 
Sheila Nirenberg, neuroscientist
Alexei Ratmansky, choreographer 
Ana Maria Rey, atomic physicist
Karen Russell, fiction writer
Sara Seager, astrophysicist
Margaret Stock, immigration lawyer
Carrie Mae Weems, photographer and video artist

2014 

Danielle Bassett, physicist
Alison Bechdel, cartoonist and graphic memoirist
Mary L. Bonauto, civil rights lawyer
Tami Bond, environmental engineer
Steve Coleman, jazz composer and saxophonist
Sarah Deer, legal scholar and advocate
Jennifer Eberhardt, social psychologist
Craig Gentry, computer scientist
Terrance Hayes, poet
John Henneberger, housing advocate
Mark Hersam, materials scientist
Samuel D. Hunter, playwright
Pamela O. Long, historian of science and technology
Rick Lowe, public artist
Jacob Lurie, mathematician
Khaled Mattawa, translator and poet
Joshua Oppenheimer, documentary filmmaker
Ai-jen Poo, labor organizer
Jonathan Rapping, criminal lawyer
Tara Zahra, historian of modern Europe
Yitang Zhang, mathematician

2015 

Patrick Awuah, education entrepreneur
Kartik Chandran, environmental engineer
Ta-Nehisi Coates, journalist and memoirist
Gary Cohen, environmental health advocate
Matthew Desmond, sociologist
William Dichtel, chemist
Michelle Dorrance, tap dancer and choreographer
Nicole Eisenman, painter
LaToya Ruby Frazier, photographer and video artist
Ben Lerner, writer
Mimi Lien, set designer
Lin-Manuel Miranda, playwright, songwriter, and performer
Dimitri Nakassis, classicist
John Novembre, computational biologist
Christopher Ré, computer scientist
Marina Rustow, historian
Juan Salgado, Chicago-based community leader
Beth Stevens, neuroscientist
Lorenz Studer, stem-cell biologist
Alex Truesdell, designer
Basil Twist, puppeteer
Ellen Bryant Voigt, poet
Heidi Williams, economist
Peidong Yang, inorganic chemist

2016 

Ahilan Arulanantham, human rights lawyer
Daryl Baldwin, linguist and cultural preservationist
Anne Basting, theater artist and educator
Vincent Fecteau, sculptor
Branden Jacobs-Jenkins, playwright
Kellie Jones, art historian and curator
Subhash Khot, theoretical computer scientist
Josh Kun, cultural historian
Maggie Nelson, writer
Dianne Newman, microbiologist
Victoria Orphan, geobiologist
Manu Prakash, physical biologist and inventor
José A. Quiñonez, financial services innovator
Claudia Rankine, poet
Lauren Redniss, artist and writer
Mary Reid Kelley, video artist
Rebecca Richards-Kortum, bioengineer
Joyce J. Scott, jewelry maker and sculptor
Sarah Stillman, long-form journalist
Bill Thies, computer scientist
Julia Wolfe, composer
Gene Luen Yang, graphic novelist
Jin-Quan Yu, synthetic chemist

2017 

 Njideka Akunyili Crosby, painter
 Sunil Amrith, historian
 Greg Asbed, human rights strategist
 Annie Baker, playwright
 Regina Barzilay, computer scientist
 Dawoud Bey, photographer
 Emmanuel Candès, mathematician and statistician
 Jason De León, anthropologist
 Rhiannon Giddens, musician
 Nikole Hannah-Jones, journalist
 Cristina Jiménez Moreta, activist
 Taylor Mac, performance artist
 Rami Nashashibi, community leader
 Viet Thanh Nguyen, writer
 Kate Orff, landscape architect
 Trevor Paglen, artist
 Betsy Levy Paluck, psychologist
 Derek Peterson, historian
 Damon Rich, designer and urban planner
 Stefan Savage, computer scientist
 Yuval Sharon, opera director
 Tyshawn Sorey, composer
 Gabriel Victora, immunologist
 Jesmyn Ward, writer

2018

Matthew Aucoin, composer and conductor
Julie Ault, artist and curator
William J. Barber II, pastor 
Clifford Brangwynne, biophysical engineer
Natalie Diaz, poet
Livia S. Eberlin, chemist
Deborah Estrin, computer scientist
Amy Finkelstein, health economist
Gregg Gonsalves, global health advocate
Vijay Gupta, musician
Becca Heller, lawyer
Raj Jayadev, community organizer
Titus Kaphar, painter
John Keene, writer
Kelly Link, writer
Dominique Morisseau, playwright
Okwui Okpokwasili, choreographer
Kristina Olson, psychologist
Lisa Parks, media scholar
Rebecca Sandefur, legal scholar
Allan Sly, mathematician
Sarah T. Stewart-Mukhopadhyay, geologist
Wu Tsang, filmmaker and performance artist
Doris Tsao, neuroscientist
Ken Ward Jr., investigative journalist

2019

Elizabeth S. Anderson, philosopher
sujatha baliga, attorney
Lynda Barry, cartoonist
Mel Chin, artist
Danielle Citron, legal scholar
Lisa Daugaard, criminal justice reformer
Annie Dorsen, theater artist
Andrea Dutton, paleoclimatologist
Jeffrey Gibson, artist
Mary Halvorson, guitarist
Saidiya Hartman, literary scholar
Walter Hood, public artist
Stacy Jupiter, marine scientist
Zachary Lippman, plant biologist
Valeria Luiselli, writer
Kelly Lytle Hernández, historian
Sarah Michelson, choreographer
Jeffrey Alan Miller, literary scholar
Jerry X. Mitrovica, theoretical geophysicist
Emmanuel Pratt, urban designer
Cameron Rowland, artist
Vanessa Ruta, neuroscientist
Joshua Tenenbaum, cognitive scientist
Jenny Tung, evolutionary anthropologist
Ocean Vuong, writer
Emily Wilson, classicist and translator

2020

Isaiah Andrews, econometrician
Tressie McMillan Cottom, sociologist, writer and public scholar
Paul Dauenhauer, chemical engineer
Nels Elde, evolutionary geneticist
Damien Fair, cognitive neuroscientist
Larissa FastHorse, playwright
Catherine Coleman Flowers, environmental health advocate
Mary L. Gray, anthropologist and media scholar
N.K. Jemisin, speculative fiction writer
Ralph Lemon, artist
Polina V. Lishko, cellular and developmental biologist
Thomas Wilson Mitchell, property law scholar
Natalia Molina, American historian
Fred Moten, cultural theorist and poet
Cristina Rivera Garza, fiction writer
Cécile McLorin Salvant, singer and composer
Monika Schleier-Smith, experimental physicist
Mohammad R. Seyedsayamdost, biological chemist
Forrest Stuart, sociologist
Nanfu Wang, documentary filmmaker
Jacqueline Woodson, writer

2021

Hanif Abdurraqib, music critic, essayist and poet
Daniel Alarcón, writer and radio producer
Marcella Alsan, physician-economist
Trevor Bedford, computational virologist
Reginald Dwayne Betts, poet and lawyer
Jordan Casteel, painter
Don Mee Choi, poet and translator
Ibrahim Cissé, cellular biophysicist
Nicole Fleetwood, art historian and curator
Cristina Ibarra, documentary filmmaker
Ibram X. Kendi, American historian and cultural critic
Daniel Lind-Ramos, sculptor and painter
Monica Muñoz Martinez, public historian
Desmond Meade, civil rights activist
Joshua Miele, adaptive technology designer
Michelle Monje, neurologist and neuro-oncologist
Safiya Noble, digital media scholar
J. Taylor Perron, geomorphologist
Alex Rivera, filmmaker and media artist
Lisa Schulte Moore, landscape ecologist
Jesse Shapiro, applied microeconomist
Jacqueline Stewart, cinema studies scholar and curator
Keeanga-Yamahtta Taylor, historian
Victor J. Torres, microbiologist
Jawole Willa Jo Zollar, choreographer and dance entrepreneur

2022

Jennifer Carlson, sociologist
Paul Chan, artist
Yejin Choi, computer scientist
P. Gabrielle Foreman, historian and academic
Danna Freedman, chemist and academic
Martha Gonzalez, musician and academic
Sky Hopinka, artist and filmmaker
June Huh, mathematician
Moriba Jah, astrodynamicist 
Jenna Jambeck, environmental engineer 
Monica Kim, historian and academic
Robin Wall Kimmerer, botanist and writer
Priti Krishtel, lawyer
Joseph Drew Lanham, ornithologist
Kiese Laymon, writer 
Reuben Jonathan Miller, sociologist and social worker
Ikue Mori, musician and composer 
Steven Prohira, physicist
Tomeka Reid, cellist and composer
Loretta J. Ross, human rights advocate
Steven Ruggles, historical demographer
Tavares Strachan, interdisciplinary artist  
Emily Wang, physician and researcher 
Amanda Williams, artist and architect
Melanie Matchett Wood, mathematician

References

External links 
 Official website

 
Fellowships
Lists of award winners